Elongation factor for RNA polymerase II 2 is a protein that in humans is encoded by the ELL2 gene.

The encoded protein is a component of the superelongation complex (SEC) and drives immunoglobulin synthesis in plasma cells. Sequence variation in ELL2 has been associated with multiple myeloma and altered immunoglobulin levels.

References

Further reading